Hypsotropa subcostella is a species of snout moth in the genus Hypsotropa. It was described by George Hampson in 1918. It is found in South Africa.

References

Endemic moths of South Africa
Moths described in 1918
Taxa named by George Hampson
Anerastiini